Hobbs Glacier is an eastward flowing glacier, about  long, lying  south of Blue Glacier on the coast of Victoria Land, Antarctica. It was first explored by the British National Antarctic Expedition, 1901–04, under Robert Falcon Scott. Scott's second expedition, the British Antarctic Expedition, 1910–13, explored the area more thoroughly and named the glacier for Professor William H. Hobbs of the University of Michigan, an authority on glaciology.

Hobbs Stream is a seasonal meltwater stream flowing from the mouth of Hobbs Glacier.

References

Glaciers of Victoria Land
Scott Coast